The 1984 season was the seventh and final season in the history of Newcastle KB United. It was also the seventh and final season in the National Soccer League. They were replaced by Newcastle Rosebud United (now Adamstown Rosebud) after Round 5 of the 1984 National Soccer League. Newcastle Rosebud United finished 8th in their National Soccer League season and won the NSL Cup Final against Melbourne Knights.

Players

Competitions

Overview

National Soccer League

League table

Results summary

Results by round

Matches

NSL Cup

Statistics

Appearances and goals
Players with no appearances not included in the list.

Clean sheets

References

Newcastle KB United seasons
Adamstown Rosebud FC seasons